is a professional Japanese baseball player. He plays infielder for the Tokyo Yakult Swallows.

References 

1998 births
Living people
Baseball people from Osaka Prefecture
Teikyo University alumni
Japanese baseball players
Nippon Professional Baseball infielders
Tokyo Yakult Swallows players